Lorne Michaels  (born Lorne David Lipowitz; November 17, 1944) is a Canadian-American producer, screenwriter, and comedian. He is best known for creating and producing Saturday Night Live (1975–1980, 1985–present) and producing the Late Night series (since 1993), The Kids in the Hall (from 1989 to 1995) and The Tonight Show (since 2014).

He has received 21 Primetime Emmy Awards from 98 nominations, holding the record for being the most nominated individual in the award show's history.

Early life
Lorne Michaels was born on November 17, 1944, to Florence (née Becker) and Henry Abraham Lipowitz. His place of birth is disputed; multiple sources have said he was born in Toronto, Ontario, Canada, while others state he was born on a kibbutz in the then British mandate of Palestine (now Israel) and that his Jewish family immigrated to Toronto when he was an infant.

Michaels and his two younger siblings were raised in Toronto; he attended Forest Hill Collegiate Institute. He graduated from University College, Toronto, where he majored in English, in 1966.

Career

Early career
Michaels began his career as a writer and broadcaster for CBC Radio. He moved to Los Angeles from Toronto in 1968 to work as a writer for Rowan & Martin's Laugh-In and The Beautiful Phyllis Diller Show. He starred with Hart Pomerantz in The Hart and Lorne Terrific Hour, a series of comedy specials that ran on CBC in the early 1970s.

Saturday Night Live

In 1975, Michaels created (with fellow NBC employee Dick Ebersol and president of the network Herb Schlosser) the TV show NBC's Saturday Night, which in 1977 changed its name to Saturday Night Live (initially there was a name conflict with an ABC show titled Saturday Night Live with Howard Cosell, which debuted September 20, 1975, and was cancelled on January 17, 1976). The show, which is performed live in front of a studio audience, immediately established a reputation for being cutting-edge and unpredictable. It became a vehicle for launching the careers of some of the most successful comedians in the United States. 

Originally the producer of the show, Michaels was also a writer and later became executive producer. He occasionally appears on-screen as well, where he is known for his deadpan humor. Throughout the show's history, SNL has been nominated for more than 156 Emmy Awards and has won 36. It has consistently been one of the highest-rated late-night television programs. Michaels has been with SNL for all seasons except for his hiatus in the early 1980s (seasons 6–10).

His daughter, Sophie, has appeared in episodes, one of which was during the show's 30th season hosted by Johnny Knoxville during the monologue when Lorne introduces Johnny Knoxville to his daughter and Sophie shocks Knoxville with a taser. She also appeared in a sketch about underage drinking when Zac Efron hosted the show.

Perhaps Michaels's best-known appearance occurred in the first season when he offered The Beatles $3,000 (a deliberately paltry sum) to reunite on the show. He later increased his offer to $3,200, but the money was never claimed. According to an interview in Playboy magazine, John Lennon and Paul McCartney happened to be in New York City that night and wanted to see the show. They very nearly went, but changed their minds as it was getting too late to get to the show on time, and they were both tired. This near-reunion was the basis for the TV movie Two of Us. On the November 20, 1976, show, musical guest George Harrison appeared, but Michaels told him the offer was conditional on all four members of the group showing up, not just any Beatle. Harrison told Michaels his refusal to pay him his share is "chintzy," and Michaels countered by saying, "The Beatles don't have to split the money equally. They can give, say, Ringo less if they want."

Other work
Michaels founded the production company Broadway Video in 1979, which has produced SNL since 1981 as well as other shows such as Canadian sketch-comedy The Kids in the Hall which began airing in 1988 on CBC in Canada, debuting in the US market in 1989 on cable television network HBO until moving to CBS in 1993.

During his SNL hiatus, Michaels created another sketch show titled The New Show, which debuted on Friday nights in prime time on NBC in January 1984. The show failed to garner the same enthusiasm as SNL and was cancelled after 9 episodes.

In the 1980s, Michaels appeared in an HBO mockumentary titled The Canadian Conspiracy about the supposed subversion of the United States by Canadian-born media personalities, with Lorne Greene as the leader of the conspiracy. Michaels was identified as the anointed successor to Greene.

Michaels is also the executive producer of the NBC show Late Night, and was the executive producer of 30 Rock and Up All Night during their runs.

On April 3, 2013, it was announced that Michaels would be taking over as the executive producer for The Tonight Show. Consequently, The Tonight Show moved to New York in early 2014 as The Tonight Show Starring Jimmy Fallon.

Personal life
Michaels has three children and has been married three times. During the early 1960s, he began a relationship with Rosie Shuster, daughter of his comedy mentor Frank Shuster of the Wayne and Shuster comedy team, who later worked with him on Saturday Night Live as a writer. Michaels and Shuster were married in 1971 and divorced in 1980. He married model Susan Forristal in 1981, which ended in divorce in 1987. Michaels is married to Alice Barry, his former assistant. The pair wed in 1991.

Michaels became a US citizen in 1987 and was inducted into the Order of Canada in 2002.

Credits

Film

Television

Stage

In popular culture
In The Kids in the Hall movie Brain Candy, the character of Don Roritor was based heavily on actor Mark McKinney’s impersonation of Lorne Michaels.

The character Dr. Evil, the antagonist of Austin Powers in three films, has mannerisms and a speaking style based on Lorne Michaels.  Dr. Evil was created and portrayed by SNL alumnus Mike Myers, who was at least partially influenced by fellow SNL performer Dana Carvey's impression of Michaels.

In a 2008 interview with Playboy, as well in various other interviews, Tina Fey admitted that Alec Baldwin's character Jack Donaghy on 30 Rock is inspired by Michaels.  In a different interview, on NPR's radio show Wait Wait... Don't Tell Me!, Baldwin stated that some of his inspiration for Donaghy was drawn from Michaels.

Honors

In 1999, Michaels was inducted into the Television Hall of Fame and was awarded a star on the Hollywood Walk of Fame.

Also in 1999, Michaels received an honorary degree from Ryerson University.

In 2003, he received a star on Canada's Walk of Fame.

In 2004, he was awarded the Mark Twain Prize for American Humor by the Kennedy Center in Washington, D.C. Speaking at the awards ceremony, original Saturday Night Live cast member Dan Aykroyd described the show as "the primary satirical voice of the country".

Michaels received the Governor General's Performing Arts Award for Lifetime Artistic Achievement in 2006, Canada's highest honor in the performing arts.

In 2008, Michaels was awarded the Webby for Film & Video Lifetime Achievement. With the allotted 5-words allowed to each recipient, his five-word acceptance speech was "Five words is not enough".

In 2012, Michaels was awarded a rare Personal Peabody Award. He accepted at a ceremony in New York City at the Waldorf Astoria New York hotel.

In December 2021, Michaels was honored at the Kennedy Center Honors, along with Justino Diaz, Berry Gordy, Bette Midler, and Joni Mitchell.

References

External links

 
 
 
 The Museum of Broadcast Communications – Encyclopedia of Television "Saturday Night Live"
 
 Audio of Lorne Michaels 1967 comedy act with Hart Pomerantz
  in 2005

1944 births
Living people
20th-century American comedians
20th-century American male actors
21st-century American comedians
21st-century American male actors
21st-century American male writers
21st-century American screenwriters
American comedy writers
American film producers
American male comedians
American male film actors
American male television actors
American male television writers
American people of Palestinian-Jewish descent
American people of Israeli descent
American sketch comedians
American television producers
American television writers
Canadian comedy writers
Canadian emigrants to the United States
Film producers from Ontario
Canadian male comedians
Canadian male film actors
Canadian male television actors
Canadian people of Palestinian-Jewish descent
Canadian people of Israeli descent
Canadian people of Jewish descent
Canadian sketch comedians
Canadian television personalities
Canadian television producers
Comedians from Toronto
Companions of the Order of Canada
Governor General's Performing Arts Award winners
International Emmy Directorate Award
Jewish American male comedians
Jewish American writers
Jewish Canadian comedians
Jewish Canadian filmmakers
Jewish Canadian writers
Male actors from Toronto
Mark Twain Prize recipients
People with acquired American citizenship
Presidential Medal of Freedom recipients
Primetime Emmy Award winners
Saturday Night Live
Showrunners
University of Toronto alumni
Writers from Toronto
21st-century American Jews
Kennedy Center honorees